Willem Drew (born 1 October 1998) is a professional Australian rules footballer who plays for the Port Adelaide Football Club in the Australian Football League (AFL). He was recruited by Port Adelaide with the 33rd draft pick in the 2016 AFL Draft.

AFL career
Drew made his AFL debut in Port Adelaide's win over Melbourne in the opening round of the 2019 AFL season.

References

External links

1998 births
Living people
Port Adelaide Football Club players
Australian rules footballers from Victoria (Australia)